Dina Spybey (born August 29, 1965), also known as Dina Waters and Dina Spybey-Waters, is an American actress. She has appeared in more than 20 films, including John Q., subUrbia and The Haunted Mansion. She is perhaps best known for her role as Tracy Montrose Blair on the first season of Six Feet Under. She played "young Elise Eliot" in The First Wives Club and a ghost named Emma in Disney's film The Haunted Mansion.

Education
Spybey attended undergraduate studies at Ohio State and then received her M.F.A. from Rutgers University at the Mason Gross School of the Arts.

Career
Spybey's early career focused on theater. In 1993 she appeared in the Off-Broadway play Five Women Wearing the Same Dress. After three more Off-Broadway productions, from 1994 to 1996, she made her Broadway theatre debut in a 1999 production of The Iceman Cometh, at the Brooks Atkinson Theatre.

Her first television role, in a 1992 episode of the after school special series Lifestories: Families in Crisis, predated her first Off-Broadway role. This performance, as Becky Bell in "Public Law 106: The Becky Bell Story", earned Spybey the Daytime Emmy Award for Outstanding Performer in a Children's Special.

Her appearances in film and on television escalated from 1996 onward. Spybey was the character Dottie in Greg the Bunny, was in the main cast for the first season of Remember WENN, and also played a stripper colleague of Demi Moore's in Striptease. She played a supporting role in her husband Mark Waters' film Just Like Heaven (2005). Spybey portrayed a ghost named Emma in the 2003 Disney movie The Haunted Mansion. She had a small role in Waters' Freaky Friday.

She also appeared in the ninth-season premiere of Frasier ("Don Juan in Hell”) in 2001 in the role of Nanette Guzman, Frasier Crane's first wife. She was one of three actressesafter Emma Thompson and before Laurie Metcalfto play a specific point-in-time version of the character over the course of Cheers and Frasier.

Filmography 
Note: credited as Dina Spybey through end of 2000, credited as Dina Waters from 2001 onward, except a single 2019 film credit as Dina Spybey-Waters.

Film

Television

References

External links

1965 births
American television actresses
Living people
American film actresses
20th-century American actresses
21st-century American actresses
Ohio State University alumni
Actresses from Columbus, Ohio
Rutgers University alumni